The 1973 Manly-Warringah Sea Eagles season was the 27th in the club's history since their entry into the then New South Wales Rugby Football League premiership in 1947. Manly went into the 1973 season as the reigning premiers having won the 1972 Grand Final defeating Eastern Suburbs 19-14.

As they were in 1972, the 1973 Sea Eagles were coached by former Australian international and Manly fullback Ron Willey. Captaining the side was long serving hooker Fred Jones. The club competed in the New South Wales Rugby Football League's 1973 Premiership season and played its home games at the 20,000 capacity Brookvale Oval.

Ladder

Regular season

Finals

Major Semi-Final

Grand Final

After Cronulla-Sutherland's 14-4 loss in the major semi-final, Manly-Warringah expected the Sharks would be fired up for the Grand Final. And they were. Ian Heads wrote in the Sunday Telegraph the next day that It was a Grand Final as tough and dirty as any bar-room brawl. Alan Clarkson wrote in the Sun Herald The fare served up in the first half belonged in the Colosseum. The first half was not how the game's administrators would have wished to show-case rugby league, every tackle was loaded with menace and meant to damage. But from the melee Bob Fulton emerged and showed his unrivalled skill. Heads and Clarkson wrote of his "towering genius" and "football brilliance" respectively.

Manly's English import Malcolm Reilly, himself never one to take a backward step, was the first victim of the carnage. In the opening minute, Cronulla hooker Ron "Rocky" Turner set his sights on Reilly as the Englishman got an early kick away to take advantage of a strong breeze blowing towards the Bradman Stand (Paddington End). Turner missed Reilly the first time around, but didn't miss him a few minutes later. The Manly lock was left in agony from a badly bruised hip and had to leave the field for pain-killing injections. Knowing he probably wouldn't last the first half he then returned to the field and created mayhem despite the injections he received failing to work properly. He set about doing as much physical damage to Cronulla players as he could, but bowed out in the 25th minute and was replaced by reserve forward John Bucknall, who had played in Manly's winning Reserve Grade Grand Final side earlier in the day. Bucknall didn't think he would be needed and actually had a full lunch and soft drink shortly before the first grade game began.

After a number of brawls in the first half, referee Keith Page eventually called in all 26 players twice for mass cautions, threatening that any more foul play would result in players being sent off. Despite his warnings the back-alley tactics continued from both teams, and Page didn't send anyone from the field.

Then Fulton took over in the 29th and 58th minutes. 'Bozo' demonstrated power and pace in both tries. The first came from a brilliant Fred Jones flick pass
 which saw Fulton split Eric Archer and Steve Rogers just twenty-five metres from the line. Fulton ran around to touch down near the posts and give Graham Eadie an easier shot at conversion which he duly slotted through the posts. Manly took a 5-0 scoreline to the half time break.

The second Fulton try came after Eadie took a pass from five-eighth Ian Martin, then looked for Fulton and set him up perfectly. Fulton raced for the Brewongle Stand corner and managed to put the ball down before being bundled into touch by Rogers and replacement fullback Rick Bourke. From out wide Eadie missed the conversion to make it 8-2 (Steve Rogers had kicked a penalty goal before Fulton scored his second try).

Cronulla had to wait a long time before they dented the Manly line. It was in the 70th minute that the crack appeared. Trailing 8-2, the Sharks struck when lock Greg Pierce positioned Rick Bourke for a try (Bourke was flattened by Manly winger Max Brown as he scored, resulting in a broken thumb for Brown). Rogers easily kicked the conversion to reduce the deficit to just one point. Eadie stretched the lead to three points from a penalty kick and then the Sharks rallied and bombarded Manly. Ultimately, the Manly defence of John Mayes, Terry Randall, Peter Peters, Eadie and Fulton were up to the task. It will, however, go down in Sharks folklore that a Tommy Bishop flick pass in the dying moments failed to go to hand with the Manly line wide open. It was a set move Cronulla had successfully played all year, but had adjusted for the Grand Final in anticipation of Manly's familiarity with the standard move. As expected, the Manly defence reacted to snuff out the set play, leaving a gap that Bishop's pass managed to pinpoint. But in the heat of the moment, Sharks second-rower Ken Maddison also played for the old move, ran the wrong line and the ball went to ground - and with it went the premiership.

Player statistics
Note: Games and (sub) show total games played, e.g. 1 (1) is 2 games played.

Representative Players

International

 Australia – Ray Branighan, Graham Eadie, Bob Fulton, Bill Hamilton, John O'Neill, Dennis Ward

State
 New South Wales – Ray Branighan, Graham Eadie, Bob Fulton, Bill Hamilton, Fred Jones, Ian Martin, Terry Randall

City vs Country
 City Firsts – Bob Fulton, Ray Branighan,
City under 23 Chris Ryan

References

External links
Manly Warringah Sea Eagles official website
National Rugby League official website

Manly Warringah Sea Eagles seasons
Manly-Warringah Sea Eagles season
Manly-Warringah Sea Eagles season